Jabulani Sibanda is the former chairman of Zimbabwe National Liberation War Veterans Association (ZNLWVA), an organisation originally comprising all the veterans that fought during the Second Chimurenga or Zimbabwe War of Liberation which ended in 1979, although he took no part in the war. Under his leadership the ZNLWVA mobilised War Veterans and other ZANU PF sympathisers in the forced and often violent appropriation of farmland they claimed to have been stolen during colonisation. He was expelled from ZANU-PF in 2014 for being part of the Tsholotsho Declaration.

2008 general election

Robert Mugabe endorsement 
Despite the fact that he was expelled and therefore not a member of ZANU-PF, Sibanda, together with his ally Joseph Chinotimba, led "million-men" marches across the country to endorse President Robert Mugabe as the candidate for ZANU-PF in the March 2008 presidential election. Jabulani was inducted as chairman of the war veterans with blessing from Mugabe. Mugabe at one time wanted Jabulani to be Matebeleland ZANU-PF chairman, an influential position, but heavyweights in the region refused to acquiesce to this.

Simba Makoni candidacy 
Jabulani Sibanda, in his capacity as the chairman of the war veterans association, indicated that the former guerillas would go back into the bush if Mugabe lost the 2008 presidential election to Simba Makoni.

Expulsion and arrest 

Jabulani Sibanda was expelled from Zanu PF and ousted as leader of the ZNLWVA at the end of 2014 because of his apparent allegiance to beleaguered Vice President Joice Mujuru. He was succeeded by the outspoken Chris Mutsvangwa as the chairman of war veterans. He denounced Mugabe for trying to manipulate ZANU-PF structures into endorsing his hidden motives of having his wife, Grace Mugabe, as his successor. JB as he is affectionately known was openly opposed to it and denounced it as a "bedroom coup".

See also 
Robert Mugabe
ZANU-PF

References 

Living people
ZANU–PF politicians
Year of birth missing (living people)
Northern Ndebele people
21st-century Zimbabwean politicians